Mario Suresh Villavarayan also spelt as Mario Villavarayen (born 22 August 1973 in Colombo, Sri Lanka) is a former Sri Lankan cricketer of Tamil origin. He was a right-handed batsman and a right-arm fast-medium bowler. He played 116 first-class and 58 List A matches for various teams in Sri Lanka. He represented Sri Lanka at the 1998 Commonwealth Games, where cricket was included in the Commonwealth Games for the first time. He also worked as fitness trainer of Sri Lanka and Bangladesh men's national cricket teams for six years each. He also held the dual role as fast bowling coach and fitness trainer coach of defunct LPL team Jaffna Stallions. He is also renowned for raising his concerns over the need of national fitness policy in Sri Lanka.

Career 
He made his Sri Lanka 'A' side debut in 1994. During the 1996-97 domestic season, he took 9 for 15 in an innings in a first-class match for Bloomfield Cricket and Athletic Club against Police Sports Club.

Despite being a regular member of Sri Lanka A during his playing career, he received his maiden national call-up for the England tour of Sri Lanka in 1998. However, he didn't receive the opportunity to play in any of the international matches except for the tour matches. Although he never played Test cricket or One Day International for Sri Lanka, he was selected to the Sri Lankan squad for the cricket tournament at the 1998 Commonwealth Games where Sri Lanka finished fourth in the competition.

He retired from cricket after the end of 2004-05 domestic season and his last List A match appearance came on 14 December 2004 when playing for Tamil Union Cricket and Athletic Club against Galle Cricket Club. He moved to Australia in order to pursue his coaching career. He then went onto play and coach Preston CC in Melbourne for two years. He also qualified as an Australian Level II coach and obtained bachelor's degree in Exercise Science. He also pursued a three-year degree in Sports Science in Australia.

He was roped in as the Strength and Conditioning coach by Sri Lanka Cricket in 2008 when he returned to Sri Lanka from Melbourne in that year. He served as the strength and conditioning coach of Sri Lankan team for six years until 2014 and also handled the Sri Lanka A and Development squads. In 2014, he was appointed as the strength and conditioning coach of Bangladesh cricket team replacing David Dwyer. Following the end of 2019 Cricket World Cup, his contract was extended by the Bangladesh Cricket Board for further two years.

However, in February 2020, he handed his resignation to BCB in order to join Sunrisers Hyderabad for the 2020 Indian Premier League. He was subsequently replaced by Nick Lee as the trainer of Bangladesh team. He was appointed as the fitness trainer of Sunrisers Hyderabad in 2020 for a three-year deal. He was also appointed as the fast bowling coach as well as fitness trainer for Jaffna Stallions in 2020 ahead of the inaugural edition of the Lanka Premier League which commenced in 2020.

References

External links

1973 births
Living people
Sri Lankan cricketers
Cricketers at the 1998 Commonwealth Games
Colombo Cricket Club cricketers
Kandurata cricketers
Bloomfield Cricket and Athletic Club cricketers
Tamil Union Cricket and Athletic Club cricketers
Commonwealth Games competitors for Sri Lanka